Kabia is a surname. People with the surname include:
Alie Koblo Queen Kabia II, Sierra Leonean paramount chief
Francis Obai Kabia, Sierra Leonean politician who served as the Operations Officer for the UN Department of Peacekeeping Operations
Ibrahim Kabia (born 1986), Sierra Leonean sprinter
Jason Kabia (born 1969), English footballer
Jim Kabia (born 1954), English footballer
Mohamed Kabia (born 1988), Sierra Leonean footballer
Soccoh Kabia, Sierra Leonean politician and physician who served as the Minister of Health